Leicester is a city in England.

Leicester may also refer to:

Places

United States
 Leicester, Massachusetts
 Leicester, New York, a town
 Leicester (village), New York, within the town of Leicester
 Leicester, North Carolina
 Leicester, Vermont
 Leicester Township, Clay County, Nebraska

Elsewhere 
 Leicester, Alberta, Canada
 Leicester (islet), Cook Islands
 Leicester, Sierra Leone

Administrative divisions 
 Leicester (European Parliament constituency)
 Leicester (UK Parliament constituency)
 County of Leicester, England

People

Surname 
 George Leicester (disambiguation)
 Jon Leicester (born 1979), American baseball player
 Margot Leicester (born 1949), British actor
 Robert Leicester (disambiguation)

Given name 
 Leicester Devereux, 7th Viscount Hereford (1674–1683), British peer
 Leicester Hemingway (1915–1982), American writer
 Leicester Smyth (1829–1891), British Army officer and Governor of Gibraltar

Titles 
 Earl of Leicester, a peerage of the United Kingdom
 Countess of Leicester (disambiguation)
 Leicester baronets, including a list of people who have held the title

Schools, universities and colleges 
 Leicester Academy, Massachusetts
Leicester College, a further education college in England
 University of Leicester, England

Sports teams 
 Leicester City F.C., an English football club
 Leicester Riders, a British basketball team
 Leicester Tigers, an English rugby union team

Other uses
 Leicester (HM Prison)
 Leicester cheese
 Leicester, a breed of sheep also known as Leicester Longwool
 Leicester railway station, England
 SS Leicester (1891), a passenger and cargo vessel

See also
 Leicester House (disambiguation)
 
 Lester (disambiguation)
 Leinster (disambiguation)